Lasiothyris exocha is a species of moth of the family Tortricidae. It is found in Carchi Province, Ecuador.

The wingspan is about 24.5 mm. The ground colour of the forewings is brownish cream, preserved in the postbasal and postmedian areas. The forewings are suffused with ochreous brownish and chestnut brown and there are dark chestnut-brown markings. The hindwings are whitish, slightly tinged with brownish grey, especially on the peripheries.

Etymology
The species name refers to the character of the species and is derived from Greek exochos (meaning exquisite).

References

 
 

Moths described in 2007
Cochylini